Parides mithras is a species of butterfly in the family Papilionidae. It is found in
Venezuela, Guyana, French Guiana and Brazil (Amazonas).

Parides mithras is very similar to Parides chabrias but has paler and smaller spots, especially the last spot of the hindwing above. Rothshild and Jordan considered it to be a subspecies of P. triopas Godart, which is a synonym for Parides chabrias.

Original description
Expanse:  inches (6.5 cm).
Male. Upperside. Both wings jet black. Anterior wings with three oval pale biscuit-coloured spots, one towards the apex, above the upper discoidal nervule, and two others on either side of the middle median nervule adjacent to the median nervure. Posterior wings with a large biscuit-coloured spot extending over the outer two-thirds of the cell, two small similarly coloured spots above, and two others below the cell, the spot nearest the inner margin four times the size of the others. Cilia between the veins narrowly white. Underside. Both wings dull black with spots as on the upperside.

Female resembles the male, but the anterior wings are rounder towards the apex; on those wings there is an additional spot above the lowest subcostal nervule, and an elongate spot in the cell on the inner side of the median nervure.

It was found in British Guiana and is in the collections of the British Museum (two specimens) and of Henley Grose-Smith (four specimens).

This species is very close to P. triopas, Godt., which is a larger species, browner in the colour of the wings, the spots on which are yellower. The specimens of P. triopas examined all have three subapical spots on the anterior wings, and on the posterior wings there are two small spots at the end of the cell, which are absent in both sexes of P. mithras.

Subspecies
There are two subspecies
 P. m. mithras range including Brazil
 P. m. marajoara Brown, 1994 Brazil only

Biology
The larva feeds on Aristolochia acutifolia.

Status
Not uncommon but not known to be threatened.

Taxonomy

Parides mithras is a member of the chabrias species group.

The members are:
Parides chabrias
Parides coelus
Parides hahneli
Parides mithras
Parides pizarro
Parides quadratus

References

Möhn, Edwin 2006 Schmetterlinge der Erde. Butterflies of the World Part XXVI (26), Papilionidae XIII. Parides. Edited by Erich Bauer and Thomas Frankenbach Keltern: Goecke & Evers; Canterbury: Hillside Books.  (Supplement 13 in English - by Racheli)

External links
"Parides mithras (Grose-Smith, 1902)". Insecta.pro. With image.
"Parides m. mithras (Grose-Smith, 1902)". Butterflies of America. Image of holotype.

Butterflies described in 1902
Parides
Papilionidae of South America